The Rhymney Valley is one of the South Wales valleys, with the Rhymney River forming the border between the historic counties of Glamorgan and Monmouthshire. Between 1974 and 1996 a Rhymney Valley local government district also existed (one of six of Mid Glamorgan). The valley encompasses the villages of Abertysswg, Fochriw, Pontlottyn, Tir-Phil, New Tredegar, Nelson, Aberbargoed, Rhymney, Ystrad Mynach and Llanbradach, and the towns of Bargoed and Caerphilly.

Geography

Created as a glacial valley, now the Rhymney River flows largely south to Rumney, a district of Cardiff. The river is the ancient boundary between Glamorgan and Monmouthshire.

Groesfaen, Deri, Pentwyn and Fochriw are located in the Darran Valley and not the Rhymney Valley. This valley joins the Rhymney Valley at Bargoed

Llanbradach is a large village in the Rhymney Valley between Ystrad Mynach and Caerphilly,

History
This valley is one of the South Wales Valleys, and its history largely follows theirs:  sparsely populated until the nineteenth century; industrialised for iron, steel and coal; industrial decline in the 1980s and 1990s. The Rhymney Valley produced a miner poet, Idris Davies of Rhymney, famous for his poems associated with the locality and the struggles of its people.

The 1990s brought improved road connections to the valley—a dual carriageway running north from Caerphilly—increasing access to and from Cardiff and the M4 motorway, and increasing the numbers of commuters from the valley to Cardiff. The area is now one of the most populous in Wales.

The Rhymney Valley hosted the National Eisteddfod in 1990.

There is a legend to explain how coal first came to be found in the Rhymney Valley. It is said that the local fairies were being pestered by a giant. They asked help from an owl, who slew the giant. As the fairies burnt the giant's body, the ground burned away, exposing the coal.

Gorsedd Stones 

The Rhymney Valley Gorsedd Stones are located above Bryn Bach park, Tredegar on the site of the 1990 National Eisteddfod of Wales hosted by the Rhymney Valley.

The stone circle consists of 12 standing stones arranged in a circle approximately 25m across with the tallest being 1.8m high a thirteenth stone marks the entrance to the circle. In the center is a flat stone known as the Logan stone. Stone circles of this type were erected on all sites of the National Eisteddfod until 2005 when as a cost-cutting exercise fibre-glass stone circles were used for the first time. 51°46'35.6"N 3°16'46.1"W

Transport
The Rhymney Valley railway runs through the valley.

Bibliography

Further reading
 Evans, Marion, (1994), A Portrait of Rhymney with cameos of Pontlottyn, Tafarnaubach, Princetown, Abertysswg and Fochriw, volume 1. .
 Evans, Marion, (1995), A Portrait of Rhymney with cameos of Ponylottyn, Tafarnaubach, Princetown, Abertysswg and Fochriw, volume 2. .
 Evans, Marion, (1996), A Portrait of Rhymney with cameos of Pontlottyn, Tafarnaubach, Princetown, Abertysswg and Fochriw, volume 3. .
 Evans, Marion, (1998), A Portrait of Rhymney with cameos of Pontlottyn, Tafarnaubach, Princetown, Abertysswg and Fochriw, volume 4. .
 Evans, Marion, (2009), A Portrait of Rhymney with cameos of Pontlottyn, Tafarnaubach, Princetown, Abertysswg and Fochriw, volume 5. .
 Evans, Marion, (2007), The History of Andrew Buchan's Rhymney Brewery. .

References

Glamorgan
Valleys of Caerphilly County Borough
Valleys of Monmouthshire